Natalia Oleksandrivna Valevska (Ukrainian: Наталія Олександрівна Валевська, Russian: Наталья Александровна Валевская, born 10 June 1981, Khmelnitsky, Ukrainian SSR) is a Ukrainian singer and winner of the "Crystal Microphone" in the nominee: "National recognition of the year", holder of the Order of St. Stanislaus.

First Steps
At the age of 18, Valevska won the "Song of the Bug" young performers competition.

Education
Valevska graduated with academic excellence from Kyiv National University of Culture and Arts, Department - "Musical Art" in 2007.

Victory and awards
Natalia Valevska is the holder of first prize at the International Contest "Seven Cultures", the winner of first prize at the International Competition of Young Performers "The Bridges of Friendship", winner of the second prize at the International song contest in the name of V. Ivasyuk (year 2003). Valevska won the contest of young pop song performers "Popstars" and received the "Grand Prix" of prestigious International Contest "Yalta-2004" within TV Festival "Sea Friends" during the year 2004. In 2005, Valevska won TV project "Chance" and III prize at the International Song Festival "Slavic Bazaar" in Vitebsk. Valevska has UBN AWARD 2004 in nominee "Breakthrough of the Year" in Great Britain. She recorded the duo song with Vladimir Grishko  (People's Artist of Ukraine, soloist of the "Metropolitan Opera") later the same year. The first album of Valevska, "Release", came out in 2006. It included songs in Russian, Ukrainian, Italian and French languages. In 2007, the singer represented Ukraine as a debutante at the "Vienna Ball", she acted in film "Lonely Angel" (produced in Russia), released her second album "Without You" and got the first award at "Yalta - Moscow Transit" music contest.

2008 year started with her participation in The International Festival "Moon Cat" Lloret del Mar, Catalonia. It was followed by All-Ukrainian prize "Woman of the Third Millennium" in nominee "Perspective of third Millennium", the invitation from National Olympic Committee of Ukraine to support Ukrainian national team at the Olympic Games in Beijing, hit song release “Dve ostanovki” ("Two stops"), which has won National Music Competition of Ukraine "Golden song of the year".

Natalia Valevska won first prize at the International Competition by Alla Pugacheva "Alla is searching for talent" in 2009.
A joint tour of Nataliya Valevska and Aleksandr Peskov took place in 2010. Nataliya won second prize at TV project “Folk Star III”, in a duet with Tanya Ftemova. Third album of Valevska “Zhelaniya sbudut’sya” ("Desires come true") was out at the end of 2010 year. Songs were chosen for the album personally by Alla Pugacheva.
Natalia participated in the project "Golden Gramophone-Ukraine" and the international festival «Crimea Music Fest» in 2011 year. Natalia became the owner of prize "Crystal Microphone" in the nominee "National recognition of the year" on 9 August 2011.

Valevska collaborated with Russian composer Viktor Drobysh to write the song “Tsvet Lubvi” ("The Color of Love"), which she sang in duet with Avraam Russo.

Charity
Natalia Valevska is the founder and President of her own Charity Foundation.
2006 - 2011.   All-Ukrainian Charity Event “Vid sedtsya do serdtsya” ("From heart to heart”).

2009 - Charitable program "Big Band holiday assistance" (Kraków);
Charity Concert "Do not give AIDS a chance";
Charity concert "Stars give hope";
"Svit dityachih mrij, svit talantіv" (“Word of childish dreams, word of talents”);

2009 - 2011. - Collecting funds for charitable projects related to protecting and improving the health of children.

2010 - Event in support for orphans “Fun on the ice to help the Children";
"Ball of Star Trees" (funds were collected for the needs of children with hearing impairment);
Charity concert "Dopomozhi - Tse prosto"; “Help – it’s easy”;
A special charity event "Make your childhood dream come true";

2011
Support for charity event " World Blood Donor Day";
Participation in charity "to the heart with very Serce";
Participation in the V Charity Festival "Mom + I" (Dnepropetrovsk).

Natalia Valevska was awarded with the St. Stanislaus Order for the charity (2008).
Metropolitan Vladimir awarded Natalia with the Order of the Barbara II degree in 2011.

Discography
2006 – “Otpusti” (“Release”)

2007 – “Bez tebya” (“Without You”)

2010 – “Zhelan’ya sbudut’sya” (“Desires come true”)

Single
«Adagio» (Duet with Vladimir Grishko)

“Bez tebya” ("Without You")

“Veteranam minuvshej vojny” ("To veterans of the passed war")

“Dve ostanovki” ("Two-stops")

“Den’ rozhdeniya” ('Birthday')

“Dno lubvi” ("The bottom of Love")

“Zhelaniya sbudut’sya” ("Desires come true")

“Kraj” ("The Edge")

“Molchanie” ("Silence")

“My shagnem na kraj zemli” ("We Step on the edge of the earth")

“Na pereput’e” ("At the Crossroads")

“Odnogo tebya lublu” ("I love only you")

“Otpusti” ("Release")

"Palala" (“Shine”)

“Polovinka lubvi” ("Half of Love")

“Ranennoe serdtse” ("Wounded Heart")

“Sotnya bessonnyh nochej” ("A hundred sleepless nights")

“Schastlivye chasov ne nabludaut” ("Happy people don’t watch the time")

“Tvoe molchanie” ("Your silence")

“Tsvet Lubvi” "The Color of Love" (duet with Avraam Russo)

References

 Алла Пугачева назвала Наталью Валевскую лучшей!
  Пугачева взяла под свое крыло украинскую певицу
  Пугачева приняла Валевскую на работу
 Наталья Валевская спелась с Александром Песковым
  Валевская споет с Песковым и отправится с ним в тур
  Певица Наталья Валевская спела для детей из приюта
  Наталья Валевская: «По жизни я — оптимист!»
  Наталья Валевская: «Артисты должны быть разными-поющими и безголосыми»
 Авраам Руссо засыпал Валевскую бриллиантами
 Наталья Валевская на сайте «Одноклассники»

External links
 Official Website

1981 births
Living people
Musicians from Khmelnytskyi, Ukraine
21st-century Ukrainian  women singers